Irene Nikolopoulou,  "greek name: Ειρήνη Νικολοπούλου" is a journalist, with one of the longest running presences in the Greek television as an anchorwoman and program host. She has been awarded for the exclusive interviews she held with international personalities and was the basic host of the two official t.v. shows of the Athens 2004 Olympic Games Organizing Committee.

Early years

She was born and raised in the neighborhood of Profitis Ilias, Piraeus in 1958, attending the 47th Elementary School and studying in the First Public Women's High School. Starting at the age of 6, she also received French education. With a special inclination for the arts, she sang and participated in theatrical performances throughout her years in High School and her first years in University.

Due to the origins of her mother, Aikaterini Tagalou from Ermioni, she spent the summers of her younger years in the peninsula or Argolida and she also frequently visited Tropea and Lagadia Gortinias in Arcadia, the two villages her grandfather and grandmother were from, from the side of her father, Leonidas. She loved cinema ever since she was a child, as her father was a cinematographer and always took her with him to watch movies in the summer cinema “Cine Alabra”.

University

She studied Law, Public Law and Political Sciences at the Law School of the Athens National and Capodistrian University (1976–1981). She also was a member of the University's theater department and took lessons of orthophony, morphophonology and theater.

She intended to become an interpreter, but her plans were changed and she sought a different career, perfecting her knowledge of French, English and Italian, studying in Oxford, Nice and Nancy in France and Luxembourg (Universite de Νancy, Universite des Sciences et des Lettres – Nice, Oxford University – Bletchington Park College, Institut Universitaire de Luxembourg). She also received a scholarship from the Ministry of National Economy for the College d’ Europe (Bruges).

She taught French and English in private schools and was hired as an air traffic controller in the Civil Aviation Authority. 3 months later she resigned from this position, in order to work as a journalist (1983). She worked for the electronic media from the start of her career, in the State television (ERT2) for 9 years, in private channels for approximately 15 years (MEGA, STAR, ALPHA) and then returned to ΕΤ1 and satellite channel ERT WORLD created for Greeks living abroad.

Professional career

She worked as an anchorwoman and TV hostess, editor and journalist in European and international stories. She traveled in many countries around the world, holding exclusive interviews from political leaders, famous artists and renowned people of literature, the arts and science.

Television

Show hostess and anchorwoman (1983–1991), editor – journalist of foreign stories in ΕΤ – 2, show hostess and anchorwoman in Mega Channel (1991–1999), show hostess and anchorwoman in Star Channel (1999–2003), anchorwoman in Alpha (September 2003 – 2005), anchorwoman in ΕΤ – 1 (2005–2010), hostess of show “Greek Panorama” (2-hour live show) in ERT – WORLD (2006–2010). She also hosted the Athens 2004 Olympic Games Organizational Committee show “Olympiad around Greece” (2002–2004) and the English-speaking show “Celebrating Cultural Olympiad” broadcast by Eurosport.

TV Shows – Missions

She hosted and was the editor of the Greek Television's first morning show (Breakfast TV) in ΕΤ2 (1988–1989) titled “MORNINGS” (Ta Proina). The show's theme tune was composed by famous composer Giorgos Hatzinasios and it was the first time that a morning journalistic show combined information with entertainment. When she was started working at Mega Channel she was asked to both present news and host morning shows (Studio 5 – Froufrou) and the same also happened with STAR (Day after Day) (Mera me ti mera).
Throughout her TV career she organized special missions abroad, to meet with people like Benazir Bhutto (Islamabad 2 times, in 1989 with ΕΤ2), exile Yasser Arafat (Tunis, Mega 1992), Lech Walesa (Warsaw Gdansk, Mega 1994), Corazon Aquino (Manila, 1991) etc. (see detailed resume). More assignments followed with breaking news such as covering the funeral of Princess Diana which became the greatest TV event of all times (London 1997). Eirini Nikolopoulou was also invited on the first assignment to the then emerging in the western world China, by the country's official journalists’ union (Beijing, Xian, Shanghai, 1997).

Moreover, she was the hostess and editor in chief of three special shows on ΕRΤ-2 with famous singers such as Charles Aznavour, Shirley Bassey and Tina Turner. She also participated in the panels of all Greek and European elections and she hosted breaking news such as the fall of communism in Eastern Europe, the Chernobyl disaster, the Gulf War, the 9/11 attacks, etc.

She co-hosted the 15-day TV show “The world and Press” (O kosmos kai o typos) (1986), the charity TV marathon – show for children suffering from thalassemia (1987) as well as the TV marathon shows of ERT for UNICEF (2005–2010) and the children of Palestine.

Editor and Host in TV Specials

She was the editor of TV specials and documentaries such as the following: “Simone de Beauvoir – Jean-Paul Sartre”, “Presidential Elections – France” (1988), “AIDS and Women – Roundtable” (1990), “Women and Media” (1991), “Presidential Elections – USA” (1992), “The Palestinian Issue” (1993), “In the Greece of Pakistan” – Documentary ( 1996), “A world without clouds – Poland” (1997), “Mission in China” (1998), “Documentary for Greece, EURONEWS” (1999) “Cyprus” (2009), “30 years European Elections” (2009).
In 2004 she was asked by the European Parliament to host: i) “The Olympic Idea in Europe” event; ii) the conference – TV show titled “Europe expands – New Neighbors” with the participation of significant persons renowned in Europe and links with Greece, Romania, Poland and Turkey; and iii) The conference – TV show titled “Europe, A Union of People and Cultures – Olympic Games through the passing of the Centuries” with the participation of distinguished personalities renowned in Europe and links with Greece, France, USA, Germany and Australia. These shows were broadcast live on the Internet and via Satellite all over Europe and from various TV channels in Greece. 
Finally, she hosted the show “GREEK PANORAMA” in ERTWORLD having as guests prominent Greek politicians and artists, athletes and scientists living in Greece and abroad.

Olympic Games – Athens 2004

Two years before the Olympic Games, she was assigned the editing and co-hosting (along with Babis Papanagiotou) of the Athens 2004 Olympic Games Organizing Committee TV show titled: “Olympiad all over Greece” which was broadcast from 70 regional TV stations all over the country and 8 Greek TV stations in Europe, Australia and America. She also presented the most important events in preparation for the Olympic Games, such as the event for the presentation of the Olympic torch and the opening ceremony of the Olympic year in Irakleio, Crete, with the participation of 100 thousand people (13-8-2003). She was a consultant in the Olympic Games Organizational Committee for international media, and assumed the English-speaking hosting of the show “Celebrating Cultural Olympiad” broadcast by Eurosport. Finally, she was active in the Paralympics events as well.

Post-Training – Seminars in International Media

She was the first anchorwoman presenting the news in English and French, due to her familiarisation with the international media. She received 4 scholarships from the English, French and American government and was retrained in a series of seminars in Paris, London and Washington. She was also invited by TV5 to Paris in 1989 for the 200 French Revolution celebrations and the 100 years of the Eiffel Tower. 
She attended personal training – stage courses in BBC, ITV, Channel Four, Independent in London, where she witnessed the production of news, editing and reports in these major TV channels and Great Britain's top newspapers. In 1986, during long stage courses in Paris, she participated in the preparation of news reports and shows of TF1, FR2 and FR3. She also completed a stage course in TV channels Arte, Canal Plus, M6, newspaper Le Monde and the most significant radio stations of France. The well-known hosts Patrick Poivre d’ Arvor, Christine Ochrent, Yves Mourouzi, Bernard Pivot, Claude Serillon, William Leymergie, Michel Drucker helped her become familiar with the preparation of a TV show according to the French journalistic “school”.

Radio

She cooperated with “ERA-2”, (February 1995 -December 1997) in the production & hosting of music show “PARIS-ATHENS” with French songs.

Print Journalism

Newspapers 
She cooperated with newspapers “TO VIMA” (Free story) (1984) and “TA NEA” (Free story – Interviews, “Ta Athinaika Nea” (Athens News) column editor (1985)

Magazines 
Guest editor with interviews and research for magazine “ENA” . 
Publisher and Manager of magazine “TopWoman” (2008–2009) addressed to women entrepreneurs in the Greek market.

Exclusive interviews

Politicians

Olof Palme (1985), Raul Alfonsin, François Mitterrand (1988), Margaret Thatcher, Felipe Gonzalez, Jack Lang, Benazir Bhutto, Corazon Aqino, Giovanni Goria, Gro Harlem Brundtland, Michel Rocard, Wilfried Martens, Edward Heath, Shimon Peres, Alain Juppé, Ser Leon Brittan, Simone Weil, Lord Plumb, Marcelino Oreja, Yasser Arafat (1993, 2000), Catherine Lalumiere, Lech Walesa, Jacques Santer, Lionel Jospin, Romano Prodi, Nicole Fontaine, Valeri Guiscard d’ Estaing, Jacques Chirac, Boutros Boutros-Ghali, Shaukat Aziz (2006), Jacques Rogge (2008), Juan Antonio Samaranch, Jose Manuel Barroso, Hans-Gert Pottering, Michaelle Jean (2009) etc.

Writers 

Eugène Ionesco, Natali Sarot, Jacques Lacarriere, Michel Tournier, Jorje Semprun, Ernesto Sabato, Claude Simon, Francoise Sagan etc.

Artists 

Luciano Pavarotti, Tina Turner, Shirley Bassey, Charles Aznavour, Claudia Cardinale, Keanu Reeves, Montserrat Caballe, Tom Hanks, Anthony Quinn, Gwyneth Paltrow, Bruce Willis, Pierre Cardin, Robert De Niro, Ben Affleck, Arnold Schwarzenegger, Oliver Stone.

Action on European and Women's matters

Eirini Nikolopoulou has been very active in women's matters and promoting women in the Greek and European Politics. 
She participated actively as a member and communication consultant in the creation of the Intergroup Women's Committee and the Political Association of Women, to promote lobbying in all parties and reinforce women's presence in the Parliament (Anna Karamanou (PASOK), Teta Diamantopoulou (Pol.An.), Soula Panaretou (SYN), Vilma Sinanoglou (N.D.) etc. 
In 1994 she compiled and filed a proposal to the European Committee DG.X and received approval by Veronique Houdart – Blazy (Chef du Secteur Information Femmes) for the establishment of the European Network of Greek Women Journalists.
 
The E.N.G.W.J. was established in 1995 with Eirini Nikolopoulou as its Chairperson and in May 1995 a press conference was held to announce its creation, attended by personalities of all political parties, N.G.Os, famous artists and writers.

For over 10 years, E.N.G.W.J. (which reached the number of 200 members all over Greece) held innovative informative events – meetings, conferences, visits of journalists to Brussels and Strasbourg and participated in a multitude of European programs (Eurobus, Equal, etc.) for better information of Greek women about European policies, reinforcement of their presence in current affairs and familiarization of regional journalists with European issues. It also issued for many years its quarterly newspaper “Ena Gramma gia Sas” (A letter for you), held and compiled research “The Profile of the Greek Woman Journalist” in cooperation with IOM (1998), participated in the implementation of the subsidized program “PROFESSIONAL INDUCTION AND DEVELOPMENT OF WOMEN JOURNALISTS” as part of the Constant Education and Professional Training program of the Pantio University (1997), participated as member in the hosting of the conference of the Worldwide Authors’ and Journalists’ Association in Athens.

Awards and distinctions

AWARDS:

	Honorary member of the committee for the two hundred years of the French Revolution (1989).
	Honorary member of the Committee “Europe and Freedom” (1991)
	United Nations Journalistic Award (1990)
	“AVRA THEODOROPOULOU” award by the Association for Women's Rights (1999)
	Journalist award “Konstantinos Kalligas” for her professional ethos and European orientation by the European Journalists’ Union (2000)
	People's award and committee award as most popular anchorwoman (2001) (TV Ethnos)
	Award for her contribution in Journalism and Culture by Rethimno schools (2003)
	Honorary Award for her voluntary contribution to “Xamogelo tou Paidiou” (2008)
	Greece's Ambassador for European Destinations of Excellence – EDEN Ambassador (2009)

Personal life

In 1990 Eirini Nikolopoulou was married to architect Myron Toupoyiannis and in 1993 they had a daughter, Elena. 
She loves cinema and theater, enjoys dancing, traveling and cooking. She collects Venetian glass objects with engraved silver images. 
Recently she has been spending time on the social media and becoming familiar with the new means of communication.

External links
 Enet.gr 
 Europa.eu 
 Ethnos.gr 
 Mega Channel 
 NET 

 Facebook Account of Irene Nikolopoulou 

1958 births
Living people
Greek women journalists